Millennials is an Argentine telenovela of drama, comedy and romance. The series tells the story of six young millennials and their lives, their loves, their interests and their conflicts. It stars Nicolás Riera, Noelia Marzol, Gastón Soffritti, Laura Laprida, Juan Manuel Guilera, Johanna Francella and Matías Mayer.

In May 2019, it was announced that the series had been renewed for a second season which had 24 episodes and that they aired on June 24, 2019.

In October 2020, it was confirmed that it was renewed for a third season of 15 episodes, whose premiere was on May 21, 2021 on Netflix.

Plot

First season 
The series tells the story of three young adults Benjamín, Rodrigo and JuanMa, who meet in an integrated office and decide to create a food ordering and delivery app specifically for homecooked meals. They are soon accompanied by their girlfriends Ariana, Alma and Florencia who will help them and also develop their own app for notekeeping at university. However, a rivalry develops as some of them begin to flirt with each other's partners.

Second season 
After the unexpected departure of Ariana, who left no information about his whereabouts, Benjamín, three months after what happened redoes his life, establishing a new love relationship with another girl, who will not have the best intentions with him or his circle of friends, whom the new conquest of Benjamín does not end up pleasing. On the other hand, Florencia and Juan Manuel are engaged and are in full organization of their marriage, which will be frustrated by an unexpected revelation that will emotionally affect a member of the couple, while Rodrigo, away from Alma, is working as an employee of his sister, since after his bad administration he lost the company he inherited from his father. However, the group of friends will be surprised by the return of a person who will make their lives change again and will have to adjust to it.

Third season 
A few months after the news of Ariana's pregnancy and Juanma's departure on a journey of self-knowledge around the world. On the one hand, Alma and Rodrigo, have the task of running a home in parallel with raising their baby Valentín, which will change Rodrigo's perception of his partner, since he discovers that he feels desires for another person of the same sex. Meanwhile, Ariana faces a complicated pregnancy, because she does not know who the real father of her child is and must take over her father's company that is on the way to bankruptcy. For his part, Benjamín will have to figure out what to do with his life when an unrecognized son appears to him and of whom he did not know its existence. Instead, Axel will lead coworking through the launch of the Shine Bag platform and his relationship with Florencia will lead him to experience other forms of pleasure beyond voyeurism. Back in Argentina, Juan Manuel decides to hide in Alma and Rodrigo's house, as he escapes from a sex crime that he has apparently committed.

Cast

Protagonists 
 Nicolás Riera as Benjamín Céspedes
 Noelia Marzol as Florencia Argañaraz
 Gastón Soffritti as Axel Forte (guest Season 1 and recurring Season 2; Season 3–present)
 Laura Laprida as Ariana Beltrán
 Juan Manuel Guilera as Juan Manuel "Juanma" Losada
 Johanna Francella as Alma Carrizo
 Matías Mayer as Rodrigo Ruiz

Co-protagonists 
 Osmar Núñez as Mauricio Beltrán
 Chang Sung Kim as Alberto
 Fabio Aste as Octavio Céspedes
 Luisa Drozdek as Gabriela Calderone
 Agustina Mindlin as Julia Ruiz
 Santiago Talledo as Facundo Ventura

Participations 
 Agustín Casanova as Ramiro Salazar
 Felipe Colombo as Leonardo "Leo" Heredia
 Facundo Gambandé as Mirko
 Emanuel García as Lautaro
 Andrés Gil as Mario
 Rodrigo Noya as Fisura
 Pasta Dioguardi as Facundo's father
 Diego Ramos
 Federico Barón as Martín Demarco
 Liliana Popovich as Raquel Gorostiza 
 Lucas Velasco as Luca Banegas
 Stefanía Roitman as Natalia Álvarez
 Romina Giardina as Virginia Conte
 Camila Mateos as Ana Forte
 Florencia Ventura as Jimena Montes
 Eugenia Alonso como Mirta
 Nicolás Occhiato as Peter
 Ignacio Sureda as Brian
 Bárbara Vélez as Paula
 Cala Zavaleta as Belén
 Walter Donado as Álvarez
 Gabriel Gallichio as Juan Cruz
 Luli Torn as Lila
 Valentina Frione as Malena
 Sonia Zavaleta as Pilar
 Sabrina Fogolini as Lola
 Francisco Andrade as Pablo
 Adriana Salonia as Vilma
 Gastón Vietto as Gastón
 Jennifer Biancucci as María Paz
 Jey Mammon as Psic. Córdoba
 Miriam Lanzoni as Lic. Antunez
 Ezequiel Cwirkaluk as Pulpo
 Chule Von Wernich as Herself
 Germán Tripel

Series overview

References

External links 
 
 

2018 Argentine television series debuts
Argentine comedy-drama television series
2010s mystery television series
Television series about couples
Television shows set in Argentina
Television shows set in Buenos Aires
Spanish-language Netflix original programming
2010s Argentine comedy television series
2010s Argentine drama television series
2020s Argentine comedy television series